Justice Maxon Mbendera SC (born Ntcheu District, Malawi; 4 November 1958 – 18 August 2016, Lilongwe, Malawi) was a judge of the Malawi Supreme Court of Appeal and the chairman of the Malawi Electoral Commission.

Mbendera held an LLB (Hons) from the University of Malawi and an LLM in International Trade and Investment Law. In 1981, he was admitted to the Malawi Bar and worked for Savjani & Co. for 13 years. He then set up his own law firm, which he would lead for 15 years until he was appointed Judge of the High Court in 2009. During his time at the bar, Mbendera served as both secretary of the Malawi Law Society from 1993 to 1995, and its president from 1999 and 2001.

Mbendera would further serve as Malawi's Attorney General from 2011 to 2012. He would be appointed Judge of the Supreme Court of Malawi at the end of 2012. That same year, he would be appointed chairman of the Malawi Electoral Commission. His term as chairperson was expected to end in October 2016. At his death in August 2016, Mbendera was survived by his wife and four children.

Notes and references

1958 births
2016 deaths
20th-century Malawian lawyers
Attorneys-General of Malawi
University of Malawi alumni
21st-century Malawian lawyers